Dre'Mont Jones (born January 5, 1997) is an American football defensive end for the Seattle Seahawks of the National Football League (NFL). He played college football at Ohio State.

High school career 
Jones was named first-team Division-I All-Ohio and U.S. Army All-American as a senior, and graduated from Saint Ignatius High School (Cleveland) in 2015. He was a four star recruit, ranked #7 in the state of Ohio and #170 in the nation. On June 18, 2014 he committed to Ohio State University to continue his football career.

College career
For his first year of eligibility in 2015, Jones redshirted as a true freshman. During his redshirt freshman season in 2016, Jones joined Dan Wilkinson and Luke Fickell as the only freshmen defensive linemen to start 10 or more games in a season. By the end of the season, Jones racked up 52 total tackles, including 4 tackles for a loss. He earned Freshman All-America honors from the Football Writers Association of America.

Jones slightly regressed during his sophomore season in 2017, but still, put up strong numbers. He finished the season with 20 total tackles, including 5 tackles for a loss and one sack. He was selected to the third-team All-Big Ten. After his sophomore season, there was speculation that Jones would declare for the 2018 NFL Draft, with draft analyst Mel Kiper listing him as the 8th best draft-eligible defensive tackle. Despite this speculation, Jones decided to return to school for his junior season.

Projected first round pick Nick Bosa went down with an injury against TCU on September 15, leading Jones to take on a larger role on the defensive line. Jones started all 14 games as a redshirt junior for Ohio State, and was selected to the first-team All-Big Ten Conference after breaking out with 8.5 sacks and 43 tackles. Jones became the first defensive lineman in OSU history to score two defensive touchdowns in a single season in 2018. After the season, Jones decided to forgo his senior year and enter the 2019 NFL Draft.

College statistics

Professional career

Denver Broncos
Jones was drafted by the Denver Broncos in the third round (71st overall) of the 2019 NFL Draft.
In week 11 against the Minnesota Vikings, Jones recorded his first career sack on Kirk Cousins in the 27–23 loss.
In week 13 against the Los Angeles Chargers, Jones recorded an interception off Philip Rivers and returned it for 7 yards in the 23–20 win.  This was Jones' first interception in the NFL. In week 16 against the Detroit Lions, Jones sacked fellow rookie David Blough 2.5 times during the 27–17 win. As a result of his performance, Jones won the AFC Defensive Player of the Week, the third Broncos player ever to win the award as a rookie.

On September 22, 2020, Jones was placed on injured reserve with a knee injury. He was activated on October 24.
In Week 7 against the Kansas City Chiefs, Jones recorded his first sack of the season on Patrick Mahomes during the 43–16 loss.

In Week 8 of the 2022 season, Jones had seven tackles, three for a loss, and a sack in a 21-17 win over the Jacksonville Jaguars, earning AFC Defensive Player of the Week.

Seattle Seahawks
On March 13, 2023, the Seattle Seahawks signed Jones to a three-year, $51.53 million contract.

References

External links
Ohio State Buckeyes bio

1997 births
Living people
Players of American football from Cleveland
American football defensive tackles
Ohio State Buckeyes football players
Denver Broncos players
Seattle Seahawks players